Cowgill is a village in the South Lakeland district of Cumbria, England.

Governance
Cowgill is part of the Westmorland and Lonsdale parliamentary constituency, of which Tim Farron is the current MP representing the Liberal Democrats.

For the European Parliament its residents voted to elect MEP's for the North West England constituency.

See also

Listed buildings in Dent, Cumbria

References

External links

Villages in Cumbria
Dent, Cumbria